"Have You Heard?" is a 1952 popular song written by Lew Douglas, Charlie LaVere, and Roy Rodde.

Have You Heard?' may  also refer to:
 Have You Heard? (Jack DeJohnette album), 1970
 Have You Heard (Dick Morrissey album), 1963
 Have You Heard (Edmund Sylvers album), 1980
 "Have You Heard" (The Moody Blues song), a 1969 song by The Moody Blues
 Have You Heard?, the original title of the 2006 film Infamous

See also
Haven't You Heard (disambiguation)